Sam Groth and Leander Paes were the defending champions but chose not to defend their title.

Hsieh Cheng-peng and Peng Hsien-yin won the title after defeating Sanchai and Sonchat Ratiwatana 7–5, 4–6, [10–8] in the final.

Seeds

Draw

References
 Main Draw
 Qualifying Draw

Busan Open - Doubles
2017 Doubles